The Bimanese or Mbojo are an ethnic group of Indonesia that inhabits the eastern part of Sumbawa Island in West Nusa Tenggara province. With a population of around half a million people, they are the second largest ethnic group in West Nusa Tenggara.

Society
The Bimanese live in the villages of the Bima and Dompu Regencies, and in the city of Bima. The main occupations of the rural population are wet rice farming, animal husbandry and fishing. Swidden farming is still found among highland communities. Urban Bimanese practice a wide range of professions, including trade and local administration. Tourism also increasingly plays an important role due to the proximity of the Komodo National Park. Among entrepreneurs there are many descendants from intermarriages with members of historical immigrant communities (especially Arabs, but also Chinese).

Sunni Islam is the predominant religion of the Bimanese. Lowlanders are known as fervent adherents of Islam, while among the mountain communities of the Dou Donggo and Dou Wawo, indigenous folk beliefs still play a strong role in everyday life. Some Dou Donggo communities converted to Catholicism in the mid-20th century.

History

Before the spread of Islam to most coastal regions in the Malay archipelago, several small polities in the Bima area belonged to the influence sphere of the Majapahit Empire, and later had close cultural and political ties with the Kingdom of Gowa in Sulawesi. Introduction of Islam is attributed in local traditions to the Malay merchants. The Sultanate of Bima was established in the early seventeenth century under the influence of the Sultanate of Gowa.

Language

The Bimanese (including the highland groups) speak the Bimanese language, which belongs to the Austronesian language family. It is closely related to the languages of Flores and Sumba further to the east, and only distantly to the Sumbawa language that is spoken on the western half of Sumbawa island.

References

Bibliography
 
 
 
 

Ethnic groups in Indonesia
Sumbawa